Count Nikolai Dmitrievich Tolstoy-Miloslavsky  (born 23 June 1935), known as Nikolai Tolstoy, is a British monarchist and historian.  He is a former parliamentary candidate of the UK Independence Party and is the current nominal head of the House of Tolstoy, a Russian noble family.

Early life
Born in England in 1935, Tolstoy is of part Russian descent. The son of Count Dimitri Tolstoy and Mary Wicksteed, he is a member of the noble Tolstoy family. He grew up as the stepson of author Patrick O'Brian, whom his mother married after his parents divorced. On his upbringing he has written:

Tolstoy holds dual British and Russian citizenship.  He was educated at Wellington College, Sandhurst, and Trinity College Dublin.

Literary career
Tolstoy has written a number of books about Celtic mythology.  In The Quest for Merlin he has explored the character of Merlin, and his Arthurian novel The Coming of the King builds on his research into ancient British history. He was elected a Fellow of the Royal Society of Literature in 1979.

He has also written about World War II and its immediate aftermath. In 1977 he wrote the book Victims of Yalta, which criticised Britain's Operation Keelhaul, a forced handover of Soviet citizens to Joseph Stalin in direct violation of the Geneva Conventions. In 1986 he wrote The Minister and the Massacres which criticised British repatriation of collaborationist troops to Josip Broz Tito's Yugoslav government. It received much critical praise, as well as criticism by Macmillan's authorised biographer.

Controversy
Tolstoy has written of the forced repatriation of Soviet citizens and others during and after World War II. As a result, he was called by the defence as an expert witness at the 1986-88 trial of John Demjanjuk in Israel. In a letter to the Daily Telegraph (21 April 1988), Tolstoy said the trial and the court's procedures struck "at the most vital principles of natural justice". He condemned the use of especially bussed-in audiences, who were repeatedly permitted by Judge Levin to boo and hiss at appropriate moments. He called Levin's conduct "an appalling travesty of every principle of equity", and said that it was "a show trial in every sense of the word", even being conducted in a theatre. 

In 1989, Lord Aldington, previously a British officer (chief-of-staff to Field Marshal Alexander), former Chairman of the Conservative Party, and then Chairman of Sun Alliance insurance company, commenced a libel action over allegations of war crimes made by Tolstoy in a pamphlet distributed by Nigel Watts, a man in dispute with Sun Alliance on an insurance matter. Although Tolstoy was not the initial target of the libel action, he insisted in joining Watts as defendant because, Tolstoy later wrote, Watts was not a historian and so would have been unable to defend himself. Tolstoy lost and was ordered to pay £2 million to Lord Aldington (£1.5 million in damages and £0.5 million in costs). This sum was over three times any previous award for libel.

Tolstoy delayed payment by appealing to fifteen courts in Britain and Europe, the European Court of Human Rights ruled that the size of the penalty violated his right to freedom of expression. Documents subsequently obtained from the Ministry of Defence suggested that, under Government instructions, files that could have had a bearing on the defence case might have been withdrawn from the Public Record Office and retained by the Ministry of Defence and Foreign Office throughout the run-up to the trial and the trial itself.

Tolstoy sought to appeal on the basis of new evidence which he claimed proved Aldington had perjured himself over the date of his departure from Austria in May 1945. This was ruled inadmissible at a hearing in the High Courts of Justice, from which the press and public were barred, and his application for an appeal was rejected.

In July 1995, the European Court of Human Rights decided unanimously that the British Government had violated Tolstoy's rights in respect of Article 10 of the Convention on Human Rights. This decision referred only to the amount of the damages awarded against him and did not overturn the verdict of the libel action. The Times commented: 

Tolstoy refused to pay any libel damages  while Lord Aldington was alive; it was not until 9 December 2000, two days after Aldington's death, that Tolstoy paid £57,000 to Aldington's estate.

Political activity
A committed monarchist, Tolstoy is Chancellor of the International Monarchist League. In 1978, Tolstoy was Guest-of-Honour at the Eldon League (founded by Neil Hamilton while a student at Cambridge), and appeared to respond to the Russian Tsarist toast "Autocracy, Orthodoxy and Nationalism" (also a motto of the League). He was also Chairman of the London-based Russian Monarchist League, and chaired their annual dinner on 6 March 1986, when the Guest-of-Honour was the MP John Biggs-Davison. He was also in the chair for their Summer Dinner on 4 June 1987, at the Oxford and Cambridge Club in Pall Mall. Tolstoy was a founding committee member (January 1989) of the now established War and Peace Ball, held annually in London, which raises funds for White Russian charities. A member of the Royal Stuart Society since 1954, he is presently one of the Vice-Presidents.
In October 1987, he was presented with the International Freedom Award by the United States Industrial Council Educational Foundation: "for his courageous search for the truth about the victims of totalitarianism and deceit."  In October 1991, Tolstoy joined a Conservative Monday Club delegation, under the auspices of the Club's Foreign Affairs Committee, and travelled to observe the war between Serbia and Croatia, the first British political delegation to observe that conflict.

Conservative MPs Andrew Hunter, and Roger Knapman, then a junior minister in the Conservative government (and from 2002 to 2006 leader of the United Kingdom Independence Party), were also part of the delegation which, after going to the front lines in the Sisak region, was entertained by President Franjo Tuđman and the Croatian government in Zagreb.

On 13 October the group held a Press Conference at the Hotel Intercontinental in Zagreb, which apart from the media, was also attended by delegates from the French government. A report on the conflict was agreed and handed in to 10 Downing Street by Andrew Hunter.

Tolstoy has stood unsuccessfully for the Eurosceptic and populist United Kingdom Independence Party (UKIP) as a parliamentary candidate in four British general elections, having first been asked by UKIP founder Alan Sked in November 1996. Tolstoy was subsequently UKIP's candidate for the Barnsley East by-election in 1996; where he received 2.1% of the vote, and for Wantage in the 1997 (0.8%), 2001 (1.9%) and 2005 general elections (1.5%). Tolstoy stood for UKIP in Witney at the 2010 general election - against David Cameron - and received 3.5% of the vote.

Family
Tolstoy is the head of the senior branch of the Tolstoy family, being descended from Ivan Andreyevich Tolstoy (1644–1713). He is a distant cousin to the author Leo Tolstoy (1828–1910) as Leo Tolstoy was descended from Pyotr Andreyevich Tolstoy (1645–1729), the younger brother of Ivan. Tolstoy's great-grandfather, Pavel Tolstoy-Miloslavsky, was chamberlain to the last Emperor, Nicholas II of Russia, who had declared his intention of creating him a Count for his services, but this was deferred due to the growing crisis in Russia during the First World War. When Grand Duke Kiril succeeded to the imperial inheritance and rights, he granted Pavel Tolstoy-Miloslavsky the title, an elevation which was approved by the Dowager Empress Maria Feodorovna and by Nicholas II's sisters Xenia and Olga.

Tolstoy's father, Count Dimitri Tolstoy, escaped from Russia in 1920 and settled in the United Kingdom, granted British nationality in September 1946. He entered the legal profession, was called to the bar, and later appointed a Queen's Counsel.

Tolstoy himself is married and has four children:
 Alexandra (born 1973), a broadcaster, equine adventurer, and former socialite.
 Anastasia (born 1975), married with two children.
 Dmitri (born 1978),
 Xenia, Lady Buckhurst (born 1980) married since 2010 to the elder son and heir of the Earl De La Warr, William Sackville, Lord Buckhurst, with whom she has two children

Works
 The Founding of Evil Hold School, London, 1968, 
 Night of the Long Knives, New York, 1972, concerning the Nazi purge of 1934
 Victims of Yalta, originally published in London, 1977. Revised edition 1979. , published in the US as The Secret Betrayal, Charles Scribner's Sons, New York, 1977, .
 The Half-Mad Lord: Thomas Pitt, 2nd Baron Camelford (1775–1804), London, 1978, 
 Stalin's Secret War, London, 1981, 
 The Tolstoys – 24 Generations of Russian History, 1353–1983 by Nikolai Tolstoy, London, 1983, 
 The Quest for Merlin, 1985, 
 The Minister and the Massacres, London, 1986, 
 The Coming of the King, London, 1988, 
 Patrick O'Brian – The Making of the Novelist, London 2004,  – the first volume of a biography of his late stepfather, Patrick O'Brian, the novelist famous for the Aubrey-Maturin series of historical novels. 
 'The Application of International Law to Forced Repatriation from Austria in 1945', in Stefan Karner, Erich Reiter, and Gerald Schöpfer (ed.), Kalter Krieg: Beiträge zur Ost-West-Konfrontation 1945 bis 1990 (Graz, 2002), .
 'The Mysterious Fate of the Cossack Atamans’, in Harald Stadler, Rolf Steininger, and Karl C. Berger (ed.), Die Kosaken im Ersten und Zweiten Weltkrieg (Innsbruck, 2008), . 
 ‘Geoffrey of Monmouth and the Merlin Legend’, in Arthurian Literature XXV (Cambridge, 2008), . 
 ‘When and where was Armes Prydein Composed?’, Studia Celtica (Cardiff, 2008), xlii, pp. 145–49.
 ‘Cadell and the Cadelling of Powys’, Studia Celtica (Cardiff, 2012), xlvi, pp. 59–83.
 The Oldest British Prose Literature: The Compilation of the Four Branches of the Mabinogi (New York, 2009), .  This was awarded the Adèle Mellen Prize, and was runner-up for the Wales Book of the Year Prize in 2010.
 Victims of Yalta: The Secret Betrayal of the Allies, 1944–1947 (2nd ed.), Open Road Media (2013), . Reprint of Victims of Yalta with new preface describing the Aldington trial and its aftermath.
 Stalin's Vengeance: The Final Truth About the Forced Return of Russians After World War II (Academica Press, September 2021, 
Tolstoy has also contributed chapters to the new History of the Twentieth Century published in Moscow, which is a prescribed text for all Russian high schools.

Notes

References

 Daily Express, 24 September 1992
 Weekend Telegraph, 25 September 1992, book review
 The Times, 15 November 1996, major interview with Tolstoy on p. 18

External links
An Interview with Pravda.ru
An Interview by Raymond H. Thompson
Tolstoy's article in The Times on his stepfather Patrick O'Brian
Lord Aldington obituary The Guardian

1935 births
Living people
Russian monarchists
Nikolai
English people of Russian descent
Counts of the Russian Empire
UK Independence Party parliamentary candidates
People educated at Wellington College, Berkshire
Alumni of Trinity College Dublin
Historians of Russia
British military writers
Russian military writers
Fellows of the Royal Society of Literature
British monarchists
English Eastern Orthodox Christians
Members of the Russian Orthodox Church
Arthurian scholars
Writers of modern Arthurian fiction